Jesper Nordin may refer to:

 Jesper Nordin (Danish conductor) (born 1975)
 Jesper Nordin (Swedish composer) (born 1971)